The Secret of Polichinelle (French: Le secret de Polichinelle) is a 1936 French comedy film directed by André Berthomieu and starring Raimu, Françoise Rosay and André Alerme. It is based on a play of the same name by Pierre Wolff, which had previously been turned into a silent film The Secret of Polichinelle (1923).

Cast
 Raimu as M. Jouvenel  
 Françoise Rosay as Mme Jouvenel  
 André Alerme as M. Trévoux  
 Janine Crispin as Marie 
 Ginette Darcy 
 Jeanne de Fava 
 Jean Diéner 
 Gaston Dubosc 
 Vincent Hyspa 
 Bernard Lancret as Henri Jouvenel  
 Alain Michel as Le petit Robert Jouvenel  
 Gaston Secrétan
 Made Siamé 
 André Siméon

References

Bibliography 
 Dayna Oscherwitz & MaryEllen Higgins. The A to Z of French Cinema. Scarecrow Press, 2009.

External links 
 

1936 comedy films
French comedy films
1936 films
1930s French-language films
Films directed by André Berthomieu
Remakes of French films
Sound film remakes of silent films
French films based on plays
French black-and-white films
1930s French films